Kyōkō-ji (教興寺) is a Buddhist temple in Yao, Osaka Prefecture, Japan. It was founded in 588.

On May 19–20, 1562, it was the location of the Battle of Kyōkōji.

See also 
Thirteen Buddhist Sites of Osaka

Shingon Ritsu temples
Buddhist temples in Osaka Prefecture